Zwehl is a German surname. Notable people with the surname include:

 Bettina von Zwehl (born 1971), German photographer
 Julia Zwehl (born 1976), German field hockey player
 Hans von Zwehl (born 1851), German general of WWI

German-language surnames